Mattia Bortolussi (born 2 May 1996) is an Italian professional footballer who plays as a forward for  club Padova.

Club career
Born in Ancona, Bortolussi started his career in Serie D club Gubbio.

In 2019, he joined Serie C club Novara. He spent one season in the club, and played 26 league matches.

On 22 September 2020, he signed with Cesena.

On 19 July 2022, Bortolussi returned to Novara and signed a three-year contract.

On 26 January 2023, Bortolussi moved to Padova on a 2.5-year deal.

References

External links
 
 

1996 births
Living people
Sportspeople from Ancona
Footballers from Marche
Italian footballers
Association football forwards
Serie C players
Serie D players
A.S. Gubbio 1910 players
Catania S.S.D. players
Lucchese 1905 players
Novara F.C. players
Cesena F.C. players
Calcio Padova players